The 1999 WTA Madrid Open, also known by its sponsored name Open Páginas Amarillas, was a women's tennis tournament played on outdoor clay courts in Madrid, Spain that was part of Tier III of the 1999 WTA Tour. The tournament was held from 17 May through 23 May 1999. First-seeded Lindsay Davenport won the singles title.

Entrants

Seeds

Other entrants
The following players received wildcards into the singles main draw:
  Marta Marrero
  Carolina Rodríguez

The following players received wildcards into the doubles main draw:
  Silvia Farina /  Magüi Serna

The following players received entry from the singles qualifying draw:

  Nicole Pratt
  Emmanuelle Gagliardi
  Gisela Riera
  Raluca Sandu

The following players received entry as lucky losers:
  Rosa María Andrés Rodríguez
  Paola Suárez

The following players received entry from the doubles qualifying draw:

  Silvija Talaja /  Dragana Zarić

Finals

Singles

 Lindsay Davenport defeated  Paola Suárez, 6–1, 6–3
 It was Davenport's 2nd title of the year and the 45th of her career.

Doubles

 Virginia Ruano Pascual /  Paola Suárez defeated  María Fernanda Landa /  Marlene Weingärtner, 6–2, 0–6, 6–0

External links
 ITF tournament edition details
 Tournament draws

 
May 1999 sports events in Europe